is a former Japanese football player.

Club career
Ito was born in Kanagawa Prefecture on December 30, 1976. He joined the Yokohama Marinos youth team in 1995.  He debuted on July 1 during his first season, when he was 18 years old. He was the youngest player as goalkeeper to play in the J1 League. However he did not play often, as he was the team's reserve goalkeeper after Yoshikatsu Kawaguchi. He moved to Cerezo Osaka in 1998. However he had no opportunity to play, and he retired at the end of the 1999 season.

National team career
In August 1993, Ito was selected Japan U-17 national team for 1993 U-17 World Championship, but he did not play in the match behind Kiyomitsu Kobari.

Club statistics

References

External links

1976 births
Living people
Association football people from Kanagawa Prefecture
Japanese footballers
J1 League players
Yokohama F. Marinos players
Cerezo Osaka players
Association football goalkeepers